Brower Branch is a stream in Marion and Shelby counties of the U.S. state of Missouri. It is a tributary of the Fabius River.

Brower Branch has the name of Chancellor Brower, a pioneer settler.

See also
List of rivers of Missouri

References

Rivers of Marion County, Missouri
Rivers of Shelby County, Missouri
Rivers of Missouri